The Fortified Sector of Maubeuge was the French military organization that in 1940 controlled the section of the Maginot Line between the French border with Belgium and Maubeuge, a distance of about .  The sector was not as strongly defended as other sections of the Maginot Line; large portions of the Maubeuge sector were defended by blockhouses or casemates. The sector includes only four  of the type found in stronger sections of the Line, arranged in an arc to the north and east of the fortified city of Maubeuge, incorporating defenses from the First World War. The Maubeuge sector and the Fortified Sector of the Escaut were the final sections of the Maginot line to be authorized, and were termed the "New Fronts". In the Battle of France, the large fortifications of Maubeuge successfully resisted determined German bombardments and infantry attacks, despite their failure to protect Maubeuge against the Germans, who had outflanked the defensive line and who assaulted the fortification lines from the rear. Surrender or evacuation came only after the positions were surrounded and cut off from any hope of reinforcement. One  and one pre-Maginot fortification have been preserved.

Concept and organization
Initial work in the sector established a series of casemates in the Mormal Forest, well to the rear of Maubeuge. As the fortification of the Maubeuge Front was commenced later than the main section of the Line to the east, funds were restricted by the impact of the Great Depression, which had reached France. A relatively ambitious project was nevertheless advanced, planning for five artillery  (Eth, Bavai, Quatre-Bras, L'Épine and Boussois) between Valenciennes and the Ardennes. The plan was progressively scaled back to four infantry  in front of Maubeuge, resembling larger-than-usual casemates more than the mutually supporting artillery positions of the main Line. Sarts and Boussois, the last-surviving artillery , were reduced to infantry positions. Geological and groundwater conditions made construction of deep  of the kind found in the main Line difficult in the Maubeuge area. The plan was also affected by political considerations, in which the fortification of the Belgian frontier was seen as a betrayal of the French plan for forward defense on Belgian territory. A total of 300 fortifications were built to cover  of frontier, but in 1940 there were only enough fortress troops to fully man the CORF positions and 125 of the hastily built reinforcing positions.

Command
The Maubeuge sector was under the overall command of the French 1st Army, under the command of General Blanchard, which was in turn part of Army Group 1 under General Gaston Billotte. From 16 March 1940, the sector became the 101st Fortress Infantry Division. The SF Maubeuge was commanded by General Hanaut, then General Béjard from 1 January 1940. The command post was at the Wargnories farm.

Description

Sub-sector of Hainaut
87th Fortress Infantry Regiment ( (RIF)), Lt. Colonel Corbeil

Resistance line (FCR/RM):
 Blockhaus du Grand-Condé Ouest
 Blockhaus du Grand-Condé Est
 Blockhaus du Bois-Crête
 Blockhaus du Bois-Crête (2)
 Blockhaus de la Tournichette
 Blockhaus de la Flamengrie
 Blockhaus de Ruaince
 Blockhaus de la Perche-Rompue
 Blockhaus de la Ferme-de-la-Tour
 Blockhaus de Saint Vaast-la-Vallé
 Blockhaus de la Talpiette
 Blockhaus de la Belle-Hôtesse
 Blockhaus du Quêne-Luquet
 Blockhaus de Houdain Sud-Est
 Blockhaus de la Chemin-de-Fer Ouest
 Blockhaus de la Chemin-de-Fer Est
 Blockhaus du Petit-Chêne
 Blockhaus de la Croix-Capouillez Est
Blockhaus de la Carlotte
 Blockhaus de Tasnières
 Blockhaus de la Riez-de-l'Erelle
 Blockhaus de Malplaquet Ouest
 Blockhaus de Malplaquet Est
 Blockhaus du Bois-de-la-Lanière (1–10)
 Blockhaus du Bois-de-la-Lanière
 Blockhaus du Bois-des-Écoliers
 Blockhaus de la Chapelle-Saint-Joseph
 Blockhaus du Pavillon Ouest
 Blockhaus du Pavillon Est

105th CEO
 Casemate d'Héronfontaine
Ouvrage Les Sarts,  of two combat blocks
 Blockhaus de Saint-Pierre-d'Hautmont
 Blockhaus du Grand-Camp-Perdu

104th CEO
 Casemate de Crèvecoeur
Ouvrage Bersillies,  of two combat blocks

103rd CEO
Ouvrage La Salmagne,  of  two combat blocks
 Blockhaus de la Cimitière-d'Elesmes
 Blockhaus del la Ferme-Kean-Ansart

Stop line (FCR/STG/RM)
 Blockhaus de la Warpe
 Abri de la Warpe
 Abri de Ruisseau-des-Bultaix
 Blockhaus de Preux-du-Sart
 Blockhaus de la Chapelle-Saint-Hubert
 Blockhaus de la Raperie
 Blockhaus du Bracmart
 Blockhaus du Boëte
 Blockhaus de la Ferme-Cambron
 Blockhaus du Moulin-de-Rametz
 Blockhaus de Pissotiau
 Blockhas de la Cimitière-de-Saint-Vaast
 Blockhaus de Louvignies
 Blockhaus de la Ferme-Fréhart
 Blockhaus d'Audignies
 Blockhaus du Bois-de-Louvignies
 Blockhaus du Frêne
 Blockhaus de Longueville
 Blockhaus du Moulin-du-Bois
 Blockhaus du Gors-Chêne
 Blockhaus de la Berlière
 Blockhaus de la Roullie
 Blockhaus du Fort-Leveau (Plantis)
 Blockhaus de la Ferme-Lepers
 Blockhaus de la Ferme-des-Sarts
 Blockhaus de la Maison-Rouge
 Blockhaus du Faubourg-de-Mons-Ouest
 Blockhaus du Faubourg-de-Mons-Est
 Blockhaus du Pont-Allant

Reinforcing Line, Mormal Forest
 Casemate de Gommegnies Ouest
 Casemate de Gommegnies Est
 Casemate du Cheval-Blanc
 Casemate de Tréchon
 Casemate de Clare
 Casemate d'Obies
 Casemate du Bon-Wez
 Casemate Ouest du Vivier-Nuthiau
 Casemate Est du Vivier-Nuthiau
 Casemate de la Haute-Rue
 Casemate de la Poquerie Ouest
 Casemate de la Porquerie Est
 Casemate de Hurtebise

Sub-sector of Thièrache
84th Fortress Infantry Regiment ( (RIF)), Lt. Colonel Marchal

 Blockhaus du Bois-d'Elesmes Nord
 Blockhaus du Warinet

102nd CEO
 Casemate de l'Épinette
 Casemate d'Ostergnies
Ouvrage Boussois,  of three combat blocks
 Blockhaus de Recquignies
 Blockhaus de l'Hogniau
 Blockhaus de la Buchelotte

101st CEO
 Casemate du Rocq
 Casemate du Bois-de-Marpent Nord
 Casemate du Bois-de-Marpent Sud, planned to be linked with Marpent Nord and Rocq; shafts excavated, but the underground galleries were not completed. This would have become Ouvrage Marpent, a 
 Casemate d'Ostergnies
 Blockhaus du Fief
 Blockhaus des Tous-Vents Nord
 Blockhaus des Tous-Vents Sud
 Blockhaus de Petit-Branleux
 Blockhaus de Colleret
 Blockhaus de Falquemont Nord
 Ouvrage de Quatre-Bras, never built
 Blockhaus de Quatre-Bras
 Blockhaus de Falquemont Sud
 Blockhaus Est d'Ostergnies
 Blockhaus du Noisier
 Blockhaus de Cayaut
 Blockhaus de la Pavé
 Blockhaus de Coulmie-Bras
 Blockhaus de Coulmie-Haut
 Blockhaus de Coulmie-Haut bis
 Blockhaus d'Aibes
 Blockhaus du Bout d'en Haut
 Blockhaus du Bout d'en Haut bis
 Blockhaus de Bérelles
 Blockhaus de la Ferme-d'en-Bas
 Blockhaus de la Ferme-de-la-Folie
 Blockhaus des Champs-Élysées
 Blockhaus du Bois-de-Nielles
 Blockhaus de Malakoff (2)
 Blockhaus de Groëz
 Blockhaus de Solre-le-Château (Riamé)
 Blockhaus de la Perche-à-l'Oiseau
 Blockhaus de la Gobinette
 Blockhaus de Trieux-du-Chêneau
 Blockhaus des Garennes
 Blockhaus de Mon-Plaisir
 Ouvrage de l'Epine, never built
 Blockhaus de l'Épine
 Blockhaus de la Ferme-aux-Puces
 Blockhaus de la Ferme-des-Fils-de-Fer
 Blockhaus de la Ferme Clavon
 Blockhaus de Trieux-Anicole
 Blockhaus du Garde-de-Willies
 Blockhaus de Beaumont
 Blockhaus des Beaux-Monts
 Blockhaus de Liessies
 Blockhaus de la Croix-de-Trélon
 Blockhaus de Champiau
 Blockhaus de Sainte-Hiltrude
 Blockhaus du Beau-Chêne
 Blockhaus de la Fond-Saint-Jean
 Blockhaus de la Route-de-Willies
 Blockhaus du Fond-Madame

Second position
 Blockhaus de Bellevue Nord
 Blockhaus de Bellevue Sud
 Blockhaus de Belleux
 Blockhaus des Beaux-Sarts

History

Battle of France
On 16 May 1940, elements of German Army Group A, including the German 8th and 28th Infantry Divisions crossed the Belgian-French border, heading east along the frontier, directly for Maubeuge.  Just to the south the German 5th and 7th Panzer Divisions moved on a parallel line, along with the German 12th Infantry Division. The retreating French 1st and 9th Armies fell back to Maubeuge. The 28th ID and the 5th Panzer Division quickly moved against Maubeuge from the south, capturing the city's Vauban citadel on 17–18 May. Fort de Leveau to the northwest of Maubeuge fell on 18 May, a victim of German forces that had moved behind Maubeuge. By the 19th the German formations had rolled up the fortification lines along their path, and had encircled the remaining Maubeuge fortifications.  Boussois, the easternmost , came under attack on the 18th from the 28th ID and the 5th Panzer Division. As the day wore on, Ouvrage La Salmagne, Ouvrage Bersillies and Ouvrage Les Sarts all came under fire from the rear. Each position resisted fiercely, holding off the attack for several days, despite direct fire by German 8.8cm anti-tank guns that progressively reduced their ability to respond. Boussois and Les Sarts came under attack by Stukas on 20 May. The Héronfontaine casemate came under sustained attack on 21 May, and a German 210mm mortar began firing on Boussois the same day. The bombardments continued, but were not able to bring about a surrender. Infantry assaults eventually reduced the positions one by one: Boussois at 1100 and La Salmagne at 2030 hours on 22 May, Bersillies at 1015 on 23 May with the nearby casemate Crèvecoeur, and finally Les Sarts at 1100 on 23 May. The garrison of casemate Héronfontaine held out until nightfall, when they were able to slip away.

As the  came under attack, the surrounding blockhouses were being reduced one by one. The 5th Panzer Division moved into the Mormal Forest and cleared the defensive line there, where a major four-day battle had taken place between French and German mechanized forces. Despite the fierceness of the fighting around Maubeuge, casualties on both sides were light. The delay allowed a significant portion of the 84th RIF to escape to the Dunkirk pocket to be evacuated to England, while the 87th RIF escaped to Normandy to be captured weeks later.

The Germans stripped the Maubeuge fortifications during the Occupation, removing weapons for re-use and salvaging the massive steel cloches for scrap. While Maginot fortifications in other sectors were restored for further use during the Cold War, the SF Maubeuge was not reactivated.

Units
The 84th Fortress Infantry Regiment occupied the sub-sector of Thiérache, spending the winter of 1939–1940 building the Avesnes belt of light fortifications. The regiment's second and third battalions faced Rommel's 7th Panzer Division.  As German forces reduced the defenses the individual battalions were compelled to retreat. The first battalion was captured at Blarégnies on 22 and 23 May. The remaining units made their way to Dunkerque where they were evacuated to England in the Dunkirk evacuation. Four years later the unit returned as part of the French 54th Infantry Regiment, which was captured by German forces in the Falaise area on 17 and 18 June 1944.

The 87th Fortress Infantry Regiment manned the Hainaut sub-sector.  Attacked from 17 May, the regiment began to fall back to Erguennes on 20 May, while the fortified positions held out until 23 May. The first battalion was able to escape to Dunkerque and was evacuated. The unit formed part of the ill-fated 54th IR in Normandy, and was captured at Falaise.

Present status
La Salmagne is managed by a preservation society and is occasionally open to the public. Fort de Leveau is preserved by the town of Feignies and its World War II era additions are preserved as well.

Notes

References

Bibliography 
Allcorn, William. The Maginot Line 1928–45. Oxford: Osprey Publishing, 2003. 
Degon, André; Zylberyng, Didier, La Ligne Maginot: Guide des Forts à Visiter, Editions Ouest-France, 2014.  
Kaufmann, J. E. and Kaufmann, H. W. Fortress France: The Maginot Line and French Defenses in World War II, Stackpole Books, 2006. 
Kaufmann, J. E., Kaufmann, H. W., Jancovič-Potočnik, A. and Lang, P. The Maginot Line: History and Guide, Pen and Sword, 2011. 
Mary, Jean-Yves; Hohnadel, Alain; Sicard, Jacques. Hommes et Ouvrages de la Ligne Maginot, vol. 1. Paris, Histoire & Collections, 2001.  
Mary, Jean-Yves; Hohnadel, Alain; Sicard, Jacques. Hommes et Ouvrages de la Ligne Maginot, vol. 3. Paris, Histoire & Collections, 2003.  
Mary, Jean-Yves; Hohnadel, Alain; Sicard, Jacques. Hommes et Ouvrages de la Ligne Maginot, vol. 5. Paris, Histoire & Collections, 2009.  
Romanych, Marc; Rupp, Martin. Maginot Line 1940: Battles on the French Frontier. Oxford: Osprey, 2010.

External links
 "Fortified Sector of Maubeuge" at fortiff.be 
 Association Amifort, La Salmagne official site 
 Fort de Leveau (59) at Chemins de mémoire 
Le Secteur Fortifié de Maubeuge (SFM) at marcel.caty.free.fr 
 Le Secteur Fortifié de Maubeuge  at wikimaginot.eu 

Fortified sector of Maubeuge
Maginot Line
French border defenses before World War II